Antanambe is a municipality  in Madagascar. It belongs to the district of Ambilobe, which is a part of Diana Region.

References 

Populated places in Diana Region